Andraez Montrell "Greedy" Williams (born December 3, 1997) is an American football cornerback for the Philadelphia Eagles of the National Football League (NFL). He played college football at LSU and was drafted by the Cleveland Browns in the second round of the 2019 NFL Draft.

High school career
At Calvary Baptist Academy, Williams was able to win consecutive state titles, with quarterback Shea Patterson.

College career
After redshirting his first year, Williams earned a starting spot after junior Kevin Toliver II was suspended.  After Toliver came back from suspension, Williams kept his spot throughout the season.  As a freshman, Williams led the SEC in interceptions and passes defended.  As a result, he was selected to the All-SEC first-team.  He became only the second LSU freshman to make the All-SEC team since 1986 (the other being Brad Wing in 2011). On December 2, 2018, Williams announced that he would forgo his remaining two years of eligibility and declare for the 2019 NFL Draft.

College statistics

Professional career

Cleveland Browns
Williams was drafted by the Cleveland Browns in the second round (46th overall) of the 2019 NFL Draft.

After suffering a nerve injury in his shoulder during training camp, Williams was placed on injured reserve on October 12, 2020.

Williams was placed on injured reserve with a hamstring injury on September 9, 2022. He was activated on October 15, 2022.

Philadelphia Eagles
On March 16, 2023, the Philadelphia Eagles signed Williams to a one year contract.

NFL career statistics

Personal life
Williams was nicknamed "Greedy" by his aunt, who called him "Greedy-Deedee" after babysitting him as an infant.  His mother later took out the Deedee, and Williams adopted the name.  In 2015, he told USA Today "I love [the nickname]. They say it’s a great DB name. It helps to be greedy as a defensive back."

His brother Rodarius Williams is an American football cornerback who was drafted by the New York Giants of the National Football League (NFL) as a sixth round pick (#201 overall) in the 2021 NFL Draft. Rodarius played college football at Oklahoma State.

References

External links
 Sports Reference (college)

Cleveland Browns bio
LSU Tigers bio

1997 births
Living people
Players of American football from Shreveport, Louisiana
American football cornerbacks
LSU Tigers football players
All-American college football players
Cleveland Browns players
Philadelphia Eagles players